Molk-e Jahan (also Romanized as Molk-e Jahān) is a village in Sheykh Neshin Rural District, Shanderman District, Masal County, Gilan Province, Iran. At the 2006 census, its population was 323, in 80 families.

References 

Populated places in Masal County